The Mobile Yacht Club is a private boat club and harbor which first met as a group in 1847 before establishing a physical clubhouse in the 1850s. It is located in Mobile, Alabama.

The Mobile Yacht Club sponsors and participates annually in numerous Club regattas, as well as races in affiliation with the Gulf Yachting Association, of which MYC is a charter member. The club and its individual members have competed local, regional, national, and international local races including the Dauphin Island Regatta, the GYA sponsored Liptons, the Broken Triangle Race, the Around-the-Rig Regatta, and the MYC Anniversary Regatta.

History
As early as the 1830s, local "boat clubs" had been holding races on Mobile Bay. By 1840s young businessmen had organized the Mobile Yacht Club (earlier called the Mobile Regatta Club), and began holding large regattas at the fashionable watering holes on the Eastern Shore, such as Point Clear, Battles Wharf, and Howard's Landing. Those regattas attracted racing yachts and high stakes from all along the Gulf Coast, and competition among cities like New Orleans, Pass Christian, Biloxi, and Mobile was fierce. Smaller races, particularly one-on-one match races were usually held closer to downtown Mobile.

Mobile Yacht Club's first club house, located on the east bank of the Mobile River opposite the foot of St. Francis Street. The club was reached by a small sail ferry, the ferryman being hailed by a whistle blown by the member wanting transportation—each member being furnished a whistle.

The Civil War and the presence of the Union Fleet in the bay successfully discouraged yacht racing, and the activities of Mobile Yacht Club were suspended for several years. But by 1868 (and possibly sooner) the Mobile Yacht Club was again holding regattas. The club's membership suffered during reconstruction, but by the 1880s, Mobile yachtsmen had reorganized their club and sold stock to build a clubhouse on a newly acquired plot on the Mobile River just opposite downtown. By the time the new clubhouse was reopened, the yacht club gained back most of its size in terms of members. A small launch ferried members from the foot of St. Francis Street to the new club. Prior to that, meetings had been held in rooms and offices in downtown Mobile.

A burgeoning membership soon outgrew that small house, and at the 1897 annual meeting the Commodore appointed a committee to consider a new building. A New Orleans architect and member of the Southern Yacht Club, Thomas Sully designed the elaborate club house a few years later, and it was built near the old location on Mobile River.

A monster hurricane on July 5, 1916, combined with a high tide and southward blowing winds completely destroyed the club and set many yachts adrift.

By then electric streetcars had lured the focus of the city from the downtown waterfront to the parks, theaters, and beaches that line the western shore. At the end of the  wharf at Monroe Park, Mobile Yacht Club built another lavish building, comfortably furnished and decorated with pictures of famous yachts. The MYC "rocking chair fleet" enjoyed watching many regattas from the wide verandahs of the Monroe Park club house. But the hurricane of 1916 swept the house cleanly away, with only the pilings left standing.

By the end of World War I, the members had re-established the club on the bay's Eastern Shore, where it had re-established the club on the name of Mobile Yacht Club, and moved to Barret's Beach. In 1940, just north of the mouth of Dog River, the club built a neat two-story house that served well for more than 30 years. After Hurricane Frederic in 1979, the current version of the venerable Mobile Yacht Club was constructed, overlooking a splendid view of the bay on the east, and a forest of masts in the crowded Dog River harbor on the west.

External links
 Mobile Yacht Club, Mobile, AL

1847 establishments in Alabama
Organizations based in Alabama
Sailing in Alabama
Sports in Mobile, Alabama
Yacht clubs in the United States